The Canadiens, Forever is a 2009 Quebec long-feature film, about the Montreal Canadiens centennial celebrations written by Jacques Savoie and directed by Sylvain Archambault. The film was launched in theaters on 4 December 2009, the anniversary day of establishment of the Montreal Canadiens enterprise.

Synopsis 
At 17, William Lanctôt-Couture (played by Dhanaé Audet-Beaulieu), an ice hockey star player passes through rough times and a depression prior to Christmas. He is unmotivated and lacks purpose and his coach criticizes him for his lack of team spirit. Meanwhile, the troubled player's father Benoît (Christian Bégin) is preoccupied with completing a documentary film about the Montreal Canadiens to the detriment of his family obligations and to the detriment of his player son. His mother Michelle (Céline Bonnier), a nurse, is deeply affected by one of her young patients, Daniel Delage (Antoine L'Écuyer) who at just 10 is awaiting a kidney transplant. William befriends Daniel, a huge ice hockey and Canadiens fan and most of the team is showing up at the hospital to meet Daniel..

Cast 
 Dhanaé Audet-Beaulieu : William Lanctôt-Couture
 Antoine L'Écuyer : Daniel Delage
 Céline Bonnier : Michelle Lanctôt-Couture (William's mother)
 Christian Bégin : Benoît Lanctôt-Couture (William's father)
 Jean Lapointe : Ice resurfacer at the Bell Centre
 Denis Bernard : Doctor
 Claude Legault
 Stéphane Jacques
 Réal Bossé
 Émilien Néron
 Doug Jarvis : Himself
 Jean Béliveau : Himself
 Roland Melanson : Himself
 Kirk Muller : Himself
 Guy Carbonneau : Himself
 Montreal Canadiens players of 2008-2009 season: Themselves

Launching 
The film was shown as a pre-premiere on 16 November 2009, at Bell Centre, home of the Canadiens. The film was launched on 4 December 2009 on the centenary of the franchise in 100 theatres throughout Quebec.

References

External links 
  Pour toujours, les Canadiens! Official site
 
  Pour toujours, les Canadiens! Cinoche page

Films shot in Montreal
2000s French-language films
Montreal Canadiens
Films directed by Sylvain Archambault
2009 films
Canadian ice hockey films
French-language Canadian films
2000s Canadian films